Proserpine–Shute Harbour Road is a continuous  road route in the Whitsunday local government area of Queensland, Australia. The route is designated as State Route 59. It is a state-controlled regional road (number 851).

Route description
Known as Shute Harbour Road, it runs north until it reaches an intersection with Strathdickie Road, where it turns east. Next it turns north-east through Cannon Valley, passing the exits to Gregory–Cannon Valley Road and Riordanvale Road before entering .

The road continues generally north-east through residential and industrial areas of Cannonvale as it approaches , where it follows a winding course which includes a bypass of part of the original road by State Route 59. At an intersection with Waterson Way, Proserpine-Shute Harbour Road (Main Street) becomes a no through road and State Route 59 turns south and then north-east on Waterson Way. At the end of Waterson Way, State Route 59 turns south-east on the continuation of Proserpine-Shute Harbour Road.

Leaving Airlie Beach the road follows a winding, generally easterly course through  and  before reaching , where it ends at an intersection with Whitsunday Drive.

Land use along the road is mainly rural, with residential and industrial developments in Cannonvale, Airlie Beach and Jubilee Pocket. Whitsunday Airport is beside the road in the locality of Flametree.

Road condition
The road is fully sealed, with a short section of four-lane dual carriageway through Cannonvale. A project to duplicate a further section of the road in Cannonvale, at a cost of $31.6 million, was to start construction in mid 2022.

A project, under the Roads of Strategic Importance initiative of the Australian Government, to upgrade the section of road between the Bruce Highway and Strathdickie Road, at a cost of $37 million, is scheduled for completion by early 2024.

History

Proserpine pastoral lease was established in the early 1860s. Other large properties were soon established in the surrounding area. Sugar cane was grown from the 1880s.

In 1892 the first school in the Cannon Valley / Cannonvale area was opened to serve the local farming community. Town alottments near the beach in what is now Cannonvale were sold by public auction in 1904.

A new subdivision on the coast was named Airlie in 1935. It subsequently became Airlie Beach. In 1960 a town named Shutehaven was established to provide a port for tourism transport to offshore islands. This subsequently became Shute Harbour.

Major intersections
All distances are from Google Maps. The entire road is within the Whitsunday local government area.

See also

 List of road routes in Queensland
 List of numbered roads in Queensland

Notes

References

Roads in Queensland